Jose Valdivia Jr. (born December 8, 1974 in Lima, Peru) is a jockey in American Thoroughbred horse racing. The son of a top South American jockey, he is the nephew of retired jockey Fernando Toro and trainer, Juan Suarez. He and his family moved to the United States in 1989 and settled in the West Palm Beach, Florida area where his father worked as a trainer. 
In 2000, he married his wife Renee. The couple have two children, Siena and Luca.

In 1994, Valdivia began his professional riding career as an apprentice at Belmont Park, earning his first win in just his third start. Riding for fellow Peruvian, trainer Julio Canani, his first important win came aboard Val Royal when he won the 2001 Breeders' Cup Mile at Belmont Park and that year became a breakout year.

Year-end charts

References
 Jose Valdivia Jr. at the NTRA

1974 births
Living people
American jockeys
Peruvian emigrants to the United States